The River Westend flows through the Dark Peak of the Derbyshire Peak District in England.  Its source is at Bleaklow Stones on Bleaklow, from where it flows south east into a western arm of the Howden Reservoir.  Its lower reaches run through a forestry plantation.

Tributaries of the river include Ravens Clough, Black Clough, Fagney Clough, Green Clough and Grinah Grain.

See also
List of rivers in England

References

Roger Redfern, Walking in Peakland

Rivers of Derbyshire
Rivers and valleys of the Peak District
1Westend